Ishmael is a novel written by E.D.E.N. Southworth. Ishmael is the hero of the 1863–64 serialization Self-Made; or Out of the Depths.  He is of low birth but has worked to establish himself in society as a lawyer. He understands the suffering endured by his mother and seeks to protect women through his knowledge of the law. Southworth is credited as contributing the "self-made man" character to literature with this novel. Ishmael and its sequel Self-Raised were both huge success. In 1921, Ishmael was turned into a motion picture called Hearts of Youth.

See also 
 The Hidden Hand (novel)
 New York Ledger
 The National Era

References 

1876 American novels